The  is an annual Japanese literary award for unpublished mystery novels. It was established in 1990 by Tokyo Sogensha, a Japanese publisher mainly publishing genre fiction books. The winning novel is published by the publisher and the winner receives a statue of Arthur Conan Doyle.

The award was named after Tetsuya Ayukawa (1919–2002), a Japanese writer who mainly wrote the Golden-Age-style detective fiction.

Winners

Members of the selection committee 
 From 1990 (1st) to 1995 (6th)
 Tetsuya Ayukawa, Kawataro Nakajima, Junichiro Kida
 From 1996 (7th)
 Tetsuya Ayukawa, Takao Tsuchiya, Alice Arisugawa
 From 1997 (8th) to 1999 (10th)
 Soji Shimada, Yukito Ayatsuji, Alice Arisugawa
 From 2001 (11th) to 2002 (12th)
 Tetsuya Ayukawa, Soji Shimada, Kiyoshi Kasai
 From 2003 (13th)
 Soji Shimada, Kiyoshi Kasai
 From 2004 (14th) to 2008 (18th)
 Soji Shimada, Kiyoshi Kasai, Masaki Yamada
 From 2009 (19th) to 2011 (21st)
 Soji Shimada, Kiyoshi Kasai, Masaki Yamada, Kaoru Kitamura
 From 2012 (22nd) to 2013 (23rd)
 Kaoru Kitamura, Masaki Tsuji, Taku Ashibe
 From 2014 (24th)
 Kaoru Kitamura, Masaki Tsuji, Fumie Kondo

See also 
Japanese mystery awards for unpublished novels
 Edogawa Rampo Prize
 Mephisto Prize
 Agatha Christie Award
Japanese mystery awards for best works published in the previous year
 Mystery Writers of Japan Award
 Honkaku Mystery Award

References

External links 
 Official Website 

1990 establishments in Japan
Mystery and detective fiction awards
Japanese literary awards
Awards established in 1990